Thurairajah or Thurairaja is a Tamil male given name. Due to the Tamil tradition of using patronymic surnames it may also be a surname for males and females.

Notable people

Given name
 A. Thurairajah (1934–1994), Sri Lankan academic
 Chelliah Thurairaja, Sri Lankan army officer
 S. Thurairaja, Sri Lankan judge
 V. S. Thurairajah (1927–2011), Sri Lankan architect

Surname
 Meary James Thurairajah Tambimuttu (1915–1983), Sri Lankan poet
 Thurairajah Raviharan, Sri Lankan politician

See also
 
 

Tamil masculine given names